The 1979 Stock Car Brasil Championship was the first season of Stock Car Brasil, with 14 races, beginning on April 22, 1979 at the Autódromo Internacional de Tarumã in Rio Grande do Sul, with José Carlos Palhares at the pole position. The first winner was Affonso Giaffone Filho, and finished in December 1979 at the Autódromo José Carlos Pace  in São Paulo, with a victory of Paulo Gomes and having as First Champion of Stock Car Brasil, Paulo Gomes.

Drivers
All cars were Chevrolet Opala.

References

External links
  

Stock Car Brasil seasons
Stock Car Brasil season